Mystic Theatre is the sixth album by Mark Olson, Victoria Williams and the Original Harmony Ridge Creekdippers, released in 2004.

Reception

Uncut magazine gave the album a score of 4 and called it "Their best record since 1999’s Zola And The Tulip Tree; Mark Olson and Victoria Williams’ rustic marriages of rural folk, western swing and bluegrass still bubble with contentment." The magazine praised Williams' composition and called her voice a "helium chirp sounding like something forever teetering on stilts"

Track listing
All songs by Mark Olson except where noted.
 "No Water No Wood" – 3:35  
 "Standing in the Sun All Day" – 2:49  
 "Betsy Dupree" (Williams) – 3:20  
 "Salome" – 2:27  
 "Grand Army of the Republic" – 3:32  
 "It Don't Bother Me" (Williams) – 3:22  
 "Wood in Broken Hills" – 2:54  
 "Thirty Miles of Petrified Logs" – 3:24  
 "Bath Song" (Williams) – 2:14  
 "Rockslide" – 2:44  
 "Naughty Marrieta" – 2:54  
 "Mockingbird Chase the Crow" – 2:00  
 "Bells of St. Mary" – 3:50

Personnel
Mark Olson – vocals, guitar, dulcimer, bass, piano, flute, cuatro
Victoria Williams – vocals, piano, banjo
Don Heffington – bass harmonica, drums, saw, percussion, jaw harp
Joshua Grange – pedal steel guitar, bass, guitar, organ
Danny Frankel – drums, percussion
Greg Leisz – pedal steel guitar on "Betsy Dupree"
Ray Woods – drums, backing vocals
Mike Russell – violin, bass
Steve Nelson – bass
Kristin Mooney – backing vocals on "Betsy Dupree"
Vicki Hill – backing vocals on "Betsy Dupree"
Phil Tagliere – banjo, guitar
Sheldon Gomberg – bass
Brantley Kearns – fiddle

Production notes
Mark Olson – producer
Don Heffington – producer
Joshua Grange – engineer, mixing
Phil Tagliere – engineer
Steven Rhodes – mixing
David Vaught – mixing
Richard Dodd – mastering
Charlie McGovern – artwork, design

References

2004 albums
Original Harmony Ridge Creekdippers albums